Chris Unger (born March 4, 1968) is an American retired professional soccer player.

Playing career 
Unger was signed to a playing contract after already working in the MetroStars front office as the team's director of administration in 1996.

Statistics

References

External links 
 Profile on MetroFanatic
 Profile on MLSSoccer.com

1968 births
Living people
Sportspeople from Brooklyn
Soccer players from New York City
American soccer players
Princeton Tigers men's soccer players
New York Red Bulls players
Major League Soccer players
United States men's under-20 international soccer players
Association football defenders